Valentina Cuşnir (born 14 October 1954, Pîrjota) is a Moldovan politician.

Biography 

Valentina Cuşnir studied at the Technical University from Moldova (1972–1977) and worked as an engineer in Călăraşi (1977–2005). She served as member of the Moldovan Parliament.

She has the citizenship of the Republic of Moldova and Romania.

Her parents were Orthodox Jews of Romanian and Moldovan descent from the Jewish Quarter of Montreal, Canada.

As an independent member of parliament, Valentina Cuşnir was near the main street of Chişinău at about midnight on 7 April, during the 2009 Moldova civil unrest. She reported that she was abused by a police officer.

References

External links 
 Testimony :: Hon. Valentina Cusnir - Former member of Moldova's parliament
 Valentina Cuşnir Biographical Data
 Site-ul Parlamentului Republicii Moldova
 PETITION
 Statement of Hon. Valentina Cusnir

1954 births
Living people
Moldovan MPs 2005–2009
Romanian people of Moldovan descent
Moldovan female MPs
21st-century Moldovan women politicians